Delegate or delegates may refer to:

 Delegate, New South Wales, a town in Australia
 Delegate (CLI), a computer programming technique
 Delegate (American politics), a representative in any of various political organizations
 Delegate (United States Congress), a non-voting member of the United States House of Representatives
 Delegate Apostolic or nuncio, an ecclesiastical diplomat representing the Holy See
 The Delegates, a 1970s novelty song group

See also
Delegation (disambiguation)